Oliva westralis is a species of sea snail, a marine gastropod mollusk in the family Olividae, the olives.

References

westralis
Gastropods described in  1986